Lee Eun-sung (Hangul: 이은성; born August 8, 1988) is a South Korean actress. She made her acting debut in the youth drama Sharp, followed by roles in the television series Evasive Inquiry Agency (2007), and the films Dasepo Naughty Girls (2006), Milky Way Liberation Front (2007) and Take Off (2009).

Personal life
Lee married rocker Seo Taiji on June 26, 2013, at Seo's newly built home in an affluent part of Pyeongchang-dong in northern Seoul, with only family members present. They met when Lee appeared in the music video "Bermuda Triangle" for Seo's eighth album in 2008, and the couple began dating in 2009. Their first child, a daughter, was born on August 27, 2014.

Filmography

Film

Television drama

Music video

References

External links

Lee Eun-sung Fan Cafe at Daum

1988 births
Living people
South Korean television actresses
South Korean film actresses